Cladolasma angka, is a species of harvestmen belonging to the family Nemastomatidae. It is found in Thailand.

Species is characterized by the shorter shaft, compressed glans and short, slender, pointed stylus.

References

Animals described in 1992
Harvestmen